The women's welterweight is a competition featured at the 2015 World Taekwondo Championships, and was held at the Traktor Ice Arena in Chelyabinsk, Russia on May 14 and May 15. Welterweights were limited to a maximum of 67 kilograms in body mass.

Medalists

Results

Finals

Top half

Section 1

Section 2

Bottom half

Section 3

Section 4

References
Draw
Results

External links
Official website

Women's 67
Worl